This is a list of the amphibians that occur in the Shenandoah National Park in the Blue Ridge Mountains of western Virginia. 

 Abundant refers to species that may be seen daily in its suitable habitat and season, and counted in relatively large numbers.
 Common denotes species that may be seen daily in its suitable habitat and season, but not in large numbers.
 Uncommon means a species is likely to be seen only monthly in its appropriate season and habitat, though it may be locally common.
 Rare refers to a species that is only seen a few times each year.
 Unknown is used when abundance has not been assessed.

References

Shenandoah
.
.